The 1994–95 Florida Panthers season was the Panthers' second season. For the second straight year, they missed the playoffs by just one point. While the team tied for 6th in the league in goaltending behind the solid tandem of John Vanbiesbrouck and Mark Fitzpatrick and finished first in most shutouts (6), it finished last in the league in scoring with 115 goals and was shut out 5 times. The Panthers tied the Montreal Canadiens and the Ottawa Senators for fewest shorthanded goals scored (1).

The Panthers were one of only three teams in 1994–95 to have a better regular-season record on the road then at home (the other two teams were the Chicago Blackhawks and the Los Angeles Kings).

Offseason

Regular season

January
The Panthers began the lockout shortened 1994–95 season on January 21, 1995, losing on the road to the New York Islanders by a 2–1 score, as Zigmund Palffy scored two goals in just over a two-minute span in the middle of the third period. The Panthers lost their next two games, including their home opener to the Pittsburgh Penguins by a 6–5 score, and on the road to their state rivals, the Tampa Bay Lightning 3–2, before earning their first win, defeating the Lightning in the second game of a home and home series by a 4–2 score. Florida closed out the month with two wins in their last three games.

The team had a record of 3–4–0 in January, earning six points, which placed them in third place in the Atlantic Division, and seventh place in the Eastern Conference.

February
Florida began February rather slowly, as after a 1–1 tie against the Montreal Canadiens on February 2, the club lost their next two games to extend their overall winless streak to four games.  The Panthers snapped out of their slump though, as John Vanbiesbrouck stopped all 26 shots that the Philadelphia Flyers fired at him, in a 3–0 victory on February 9. The club then had a seven-game homestand, beginning on February 11 with a solid 4–3 win over the Hartford Whalers, however, their two-game winning streak ended the following night, losing 4–2 to the New Jersey Devils. The Panthers shut out the Ottawa Senators 2–0 in their next game to return to the win column, however, the team lost their last four games on the home stand, going a disappointing 2–5–0 on it.  Back on the road on February 25, the Panthers snapped their losing skid, defeating the Ottawa Senators 4–1, before ending the month with a 0–0 tie against the defending Stanley Cup champions, the New York Rangers.

At the end of February, the Panthers had an overall record of 7–11–2, earning 16 points, as the club struggled on home ice, posting a 3–7–1 record in their first 11 home games. Florida was in sixth place in the Atlantic Division, and 12th in the Eastern Conference.

March
Florida opened March with two road games, as they tied the Philadelphia Flyers 2–2 on March 2, followed by a 6–1 loss at the hands of the New Jersey Devils.  On March 8, the club ended their three-game winless streak, defeating the Ottawa Senators 3–2, before heading out on the road again for two games, in which the Panthers shut out the Boston Bruins 2–0, followed by a 4–1 win over the Hartford Whalers to extend their winning streak to three games.  The team returned home for a three-game home stand, where they remained hot, tying the Buffalo Sabres 1–1, soundly defeating the Washington Capitals 5–1 to extend their overall unbeaten streak to five games, before losing in overtime to the Philadelphia Flyers 4–3 on March 18. Florida then embarked on a three-game road trip, where they began with a 5–4 overtime loss to the Quebec Nordiques, before defeating the Montreal Canadiens 3–2 to get a much needed victory.  The Panthers finished the trip with a 3–0 loss to the Buffalo Sabres, and were starting to fall out of the playoff race.  Florida ended March with a brief two game home stand, in which they shut out the high scoring Pittsburgh Penguins 2–0, with John Vanbiesbrouck making 24 saves for the shut out, followed by a 4–4 tie against the Hartford Whalers.

The Panthers had an overall record of 13–16–4 at the end of March, earning 30 points, in which placed them fourth in the Atlantic Division, and ninth in the Eastern Conference, only one point behind the Hartford Whalers for the eighth and final playoff spot.

April/May
The Panthers began April with a solid 4–1 road victory over the Tampa Bay Lightning on April 2, which moved the club into eighth place, however, Florida found themselves out of a playoff spot after being blown out by the New York Rangers by a 5–0 score on home ice on April 5, as the club fell into tenth spot, behind the New York Rangers and Hartford Whalers by a single point for the last post-season spot. The Panthers continued to struggle over their next three games, going 0–2–1, falling five points behind the eighth place Buffalo Sabres.  The club tried to claw their way back race, going 4–1–0 in their next five games, however, Florida still remained two points out of the playoffs.  Florida finished April on a three-game winless streak, posting a 0–2–1 record, which eliminated the club from post-season contention. The team finished the season with two wins, defeating the New York Rangers and Pittsburgh Penguins on the road.

The club finished the 1994–95 season with a 20–22–6 record, earning 46 points, which placed them fifth in the Atlantic Division, and ninth in the Eastern Conference, just one point behind the New York Rangers for the final playoff spot.

Final standings

Schedule and results

Player statistics

Forwards
Note: GP = Games played; G = Goals; A = Assists; Pts = Points; PIM = Penalty minutes

Defensemen
Note: GP = Games played; G = Goals; A = Assists; Pts = Points; PIM = Penalty minutes

Goaltending
Note: GP = Games played; W = Wins; L = Losses; T = Ties; SV% = Save percentage ; GAA = Goals against average; SO = Shutouts

Awards and records
 John Vanbiesbrouck, runner-up, Hart Memorial Trophy
 John Vanbiesbrouck, runner-up, Vezina Trophy

Draft picks
Florida's draft picks at the 1994 NHL Entry Draft.

References
 Panthers on Hockey Database

F
F
Florida Panthers seasons
Florida Panthers
Florida Panthers